Queens of the Summer Hotel is the tenth studio album by the American singer-songwriter Aimee Mann, released on November 5, 2021, on SuperEgo Records.

Writing
Mann started work on Queens of the Summer Hotel in 2018, when she was commissioned to write songs for a stage adaptation of Susanna Kaysen's 1993 memoir Girl, Interrupted. The memoir describes Kaysen's time at McLean Hospital, a psychiatric hospital in Belmont, Massachusetts. The musical was to be produced by Barbara Broccoli and Frederick Zollo, but was canceled by the COVID-19 pandemic. 

The album title was inspired by an Anne Sexton poem. The album was announced on August 6, 2021, with the release of the first single, "Suicide Is Murder".

Critical reception

Kirsten Lambert from the Chicago Reader wrote, "Mann probes the depths of human experience, addressing some grim subject matter—including suicide, self-immolation, and incest." She concluded that the album "isn't a quick (or easy) listen. This one will stay with you for a while." Alex McLevy of The A.V. Club called it  "an unusual (and unusually rewarding) project," writing, "It doesn't have the instant-classic pop of some of her earlier material, but as a more somber, measured collection of music (none of the jangly pop-rock of Charmer to be found here), it's a winner."

Track listing

Charts

References 

Aimee Mann albums
2021 albums
SuperEgo Records albums
Albums produced by Paul Bryan (musician)